Year 190 (CXC) was a common year starting on Thursday (link will display the full calendar) of the Julian calendar. At the time, it was known as the Year of the Consulship of Aurelius and Sura (or, less frequently, year 943 Ab urbe condita). The denomination 190 for this year has been used since the early medieval period, when the Anno Domini calendar era became the prevalent method in Europe for naming years.

Events 
 By place 
 Roman Empire 
 A part of Rome burns; Emperor Commodus orders the city to be rebuilt, under the name Colonia Commodiana.
 A Roman road crosses the Alps, by the Simplon Pass.

 China 
 First year of the Chuping era of the Chinese Han Dynasty.
 The Campaign against Dong Zhuo begins. During the Battle of Xingyang, Cao Cao's army is defeated by Dong Zhuo.
 Luoyang is burned and plundered by the forces of Dong Zhuo. The court is moved to Chang'an.

 Parthia 
 Osroes II, controlling Media, claims the throne of the Parthian Empire. King Vologases IV of Parthia puts down the rebellion and restores order.

 By topic 
 Art and Science 
 Cleomedes teaches that the moon does not glow on its own, but rather reflects sunlight.

 Economic 
 Egypt (under Roman rule) is impoverished due to an inflation rate of 100% during the previous decade. 
 The percentage of silver in the Egyptian denarius is lowered from 90% to 70%.

Births 
 Gaius Furius Sabinius Aquila Timesitheus, Roman praetorian prefect (d. 243)
 Liu Yin (or Xiuran), Chinese general of the Shu Han state (d. 269)
 Ma Su, Chinese general and strategist of the Shu Han state (d. 228)
 Quintus Egnatius Proculus, Roman politician (approximate date)
 Wang Ji (or Boyu), Chinese general of the Cao Wei state (d. 261)

Deaths 
 March 6 – Liu Bian, Chinese emperor (poisoned by Dong Zhuo) (b. 176)
 Athenagoras of Athens, Greek Christian apologist (b. 133)
 Julius of Rome, Roman politician (murdered by Commodus)
 Marcus Aurelius Cleander, Roman praetorian prefect
 Xun Shuang, Chinese politician and writer (b. 128)
 Zhou Bi, Chinese official (executed by Dong Zhuo)
 Emperor Seimu of Japan, according to legend.

References